Gordonia polyisoprenivorans is a rubber-degrading actinomycete first isolated from an automobile tyre.

References

Further reading

External links

LPSN
Type strain of Gordonia polyisoprenivorans at BacDive -  the Bacterial Diversity Metadatabase

Mycobacteriales
Bacteria described in 1999